Second Coming is the fourth studio album by punk band The Dickies. The album contained covers of "Hair" and Gene Pitney's "Town Without Pity."

In 2007, the album was re-released by Captain Oi!, with the Killer Klowns From Outer Space EP as bonus tracks.

Critical reception
Trouser Press wrote that "while hardly the promised resurrection, Second Coming is still a perfectly (dis)respectable showing from one of our national treasures." Alternative Rock wrote that the band was "bitingly, ferociously back to (near) best."

Track listing

Credits 
The Dickies
 Leonard Graves Phillips - lead vocals, keyboards
 Stan Lee - guitars, vocals
 Enoch Hain - guitars, vocals
 Lorenzo "Laurie" Buhne - bass, vocals
 Cliff Martinez - drums

Additional musicians
Jerry Angel - drums
Lenny Castro - percussion
John "Juke" Logan - harmonica
Larry Klimas - flute

Production
Produced and Engineered by Ron Hitchcock
Additional Engineering by Jim Faraci, John X and Brian Fukuji
Cover Painting by Jeff Wong

References

The Dickies albums
1989 albums
Enigma Records albums